The 2018 American Athletic Conference men's soccer tournament was the 6th edition of the American Athletic Conference Men's Soccer Tournament. The tournament decided the American Athletic Conference champion and guaranteed representative into the 2018 NCAA Division I Men's Soccer Championship. The tournament began on November 6 and concluded on November 10.

In a rematch of the 2017 AAC championship, defending champions, SMU, successfully defended their title. The final match was a 1-1 draw in regulation before SMU bested UCF in penalty kicks to claim their second-ever AAC championship. SMU midfielder, Emil Cuello was named the Offensive Most valuable player of the tournament, while SMU's Grant Makela was named the Defensive Most valuable player of the tournament. 

As champions, SMU earned the conference's automatic bid into the 2018 NCAA Tournament. In addition to SMU, regular season champions and tournament runners-up, UCF earned an at-large bid, as well as Connecticut. In the NCAA Tournament, SMU was eliminated in the first round by Oregon State. Connecticut beat Rhode Island in the first round before losing to Indiana in the second round. UCF was seeded 14th in NCAA Tournament, and earned a second round bye. There, UCF lost to Lipscomb in overtime.

Seeds

Bracket

Results

First round

Semifinals

Final

Statistics

Top goalscorers 
1 Goal

  Christian Boorom – SMU 
  Josh Burnett – Connecticut 
  Dayonn Harris – Connecticut 
  Alexandros Ierides – Memphis 
  Cal Jennings – UCF
  Andrés Hernández – UCF
  Chris Mikus – Memphis 
  Belal Mohamed — Temple
  Philip Ponder – SMU 
  Gurman Sangha – Memphis 
  Max Stiegwardt – UCF
  Akean Shackleford – SMU 
  Yoni Sorokin – UCF
  Abdou Mbacke Thiam – Connecticut 
  Cole Venner – Connecticut 
  David Zalzman – Memphis 
  Alex Zis – South Florida

Own goals

  Nick Sarver — Temple (playing against Connecticut)

Awards and honors 

 Tournament Offensive MVP: Emil Cuello, SMU
 Tournament Defensive MVP: Grant Makela, SMU

All-Tournament team:

 Abdou Mbacke Thiam, UConn
 Gurman Sangha, Memphis
 Cal Jennings, UCF
 Andres Hernandez, UCF
 Yanis Leerman, UCF

 Louis Perez, UCF
 Christian Boorom, SMU
 Emil Cuello, SMU
 Akean Shackelford, SMU
 Philip Ponder, SMU
 Grant Makela, SMU

References

External links 
 2018 AAC Men's Soccer Championship Central
 AAC Men's Soccer Championship Bracket

American Athletic Conference men's soccer
American Athletic Conference Men's Soccer Tournament